Peter Argyris Katsambanis (born 24 December 1965) is a former Australian politician. He was elected to the Western Australian Legislative Council at the 2013 state election, representing the Liberal Party, taking his seat on 22 May 2013. He resigned in 2017 to successfully contest the Legislative Assembly seat of Hillarys. At the 2021 Western Australian state election, he was defeated by Labor's Caitlin Collins. He was previously a Liberal member of the Victorian Legislative Council, from 1996 to 2002.

Katsambanis was born in Melbourne to Argyrios and Nicoletta Katsambanis, and attended Windsor Public School, Prahran High School and Melbourne High School, graduating in 1983. He received a Bachelor of Commerce (1989) and a Bachelor of Law (1990) from the University of Melbourne before becoming an articled clerk with the Trust Company of Australia. In 1992, he became senior trust officer for ANZ funds management and, in 1994, became a solicitor with Perpetual Trustees. In 1995, he founded his own legal firm. A member of the Liberal Party from 1987, he was President of the Toorak Young Liberals (1990–91). From 1991 to 1992, he was on the Prahran Electorate Council.

In 1996, Katsambanis was elected to the Victorian Legislative Council as one of the members for Monash Province. He served as a backbencher until his defeat in 2002.

Katsambanis has been married twice. He is currently married to former Channel 7 Melbourne TV reporter Karalee Tilvern. They moved to Western Australia in 2010 where Tilvern was born and educated. At the 2013 state election, Katsambanis was elected to the Western Australian Legislative Council, and his term commenced on 22 May 2013.

In 2016, following Rob Johnson's resignation from the Liberal Party to sit as an independent, a preselection was held for the safe Liberal seat of Hillarys, contested by Katsambanis and businessman Simon Ehrenfeld. Ehrenfeld won, but the WA Liberal Party's State Council ultimately overturned the initial preselection result and named Katsambanis as the Liberal candidate for the seat. Katsambanis went on to defeat Johnson and WA Labor candidate, and former councillor, Teresa Ritchie in the 2017 state election, achieving 39.63% of the primary vote and 54.09% of the two-party-preferred vote. However, that election saw his party lose power to Labor after over eight years in government.

Katsambanis was the subject of nationwide media attention after Johnson released a curious 2:49am voicemail left on his phone by Katsambanis: "Have a great day. Enjoy the rest of your life. Thank you. Bye bye." Katsambanis denied being drunk at the time.

After the election, Katsambanis was appointed by new Liberal Leader Mike Nahan as the Shadow Minister for Police, Road Safety, Corrective Services and Industrial Relations.

In 2017, Katsambanis' electoral office moved to a first-floor office at Hillarys Boat Harbour which lacked disabled access. Former federal MHR and wheelchair-using Vietnam War veteran Graham Edwards complained to the Premier but the office allocation remained for the present.

Katsambanis lost the seat of Hillarys when he was defeated by Labor's Caitlin Collins at the 2021 state election. His 2021 loss marked the second time he was voted out of office, the first being his defeat in the 2002 Victorian state election. In response to the 2021 election result Katsambanis told Perth's 6PR radio "I am done in politics. I walk away and I hold my head up high."

References

1965 births
Living people
Australian people of Greek descent
Members of the Victorian Legislative Council
Members of the Western Australian Legislative Council
Members of the Western Australian Legislative Assembly
Liberal Party of Australia members of the Parliament of Victoria
Liberal Party of Australia members of the Parliament of Western Australia
21st-century Australian politicians